Cadbury Mini Eggs are a milk chocolate product created and produced by Cadbury. Introduced in 1967, the egg is solid milk chocolate encased in a thin coating of hard candy "shell", molded to resemble a miniature egg.

Mini Eggs were previously produced in the Keynsham plant in Somerset, U.K.; however, as of February 2010, production has moved to Cadbury's new plant in Bielany Wrocławskie, Poland.

Product specification
 
 
Over the years, Cadbury has introduced a number of variations related to the original Mini Eggs, including:
 Shimmering Eggs (metallic colored shells)
 Dark Mini Eggs (dark chocolate)
 Popping Mini Eggs ("pops" when melted in mouth)
 Micro Mini Eggs (even smaller variation of Mini Eggs) (introduced in 2007)
 White Mini Eggs (white Mini Eggs with white chocolate inside) (introduced as a Target exclusive in 2014)

Cadbury Mini Eggs are made into four colours of shell.  
The original colours were white, yellow, pink, and light blue.  
In Canada in 2010, the colours were switched to yellow, pink, green, and turquoise. 
In the U.K. they are now white, yellow, pink and purple with speckles.

The version available in 2014 as seen on the box of 45g mini eggs paper carton:
(bar code 5034660522515, manufactured by Mondelez Polska Production Sp. in Poland)
 Cocoa solids 25% minimum.
 Colouring used are: anthocyanlins, beetroot red, paprika extract, carotenes. 
 The vegetable fats used are palm oil and shea butter.
 The eggs also contain modified maize and tapioca starches.

Nutrition: 
 Energy: 220 kcal. 925kJ (equiv. per 100g 490kcal/2055kJ).
 Carbohydrate 69.5g per 100 g. of which sugar 69g.
 Salt 0.2g per 100g, Sodium 80 mg per 100g. 
 Saturated fat 13g per 100g.
 Protein 4.7g per 100g.
 Fibre 1.5g per 100g.

See also
List of Cadbury products
Cadbury Creme Egg

References

External links
 

British confectionery
Brand name chocolate
Products introduced in 1967
Cadbury brands
Mondelez International brands